Mundka Assembly constituency  is one of the seventy Delhi assembly constituencies of Delhi in northern India.

Mundka assembly constituency is a part of North West Delhi Lok Sabha constituency. This constituency was created by reorganization by delimitation commission in 2008.

Assembly segment and councillors 

After 2016 delimitation, Mundka assembly has 5 wards.

Key

Members of Legislative Assembly

Key

Election results

2020 election

2015 election

2013

2008

References

Assembly constituencies of Delhi
Delhi Legislative Assembly